The 1937 Florida A&M Rattlers football team was an American football team that represented Florida A&M College as a member of the Southern Intercollegiate Athletic Conference (SIAC) during the 1937 college football season. In their second season under head coach William "Big Bill" Bell, the Rattlers compiled a 7–1–1 record and outscored opponents by a total of 132 to 74. The Rattlers played their home games at College Field in Tallahassee, Florida.

Jake Gaither, who later led the Rattlers from 1945 to 1969, was an assistant coach for the 1937 team.

Schedule

References

Florida AandM
Florida A&M Rattlers football seasons
Florida AandM Rattlers football